The Federation of Citizens Associations of the District of Columbia is composed of neighborhood associations from throughout the District of Columbia. The Federation was organized in 1910 and then incorporated in 1940. Most Citizens Associations were originally formed for white residents of city, versus Civic Associations that served black residents.

References

External links
 DC Federation of Citizens' Associations Home Page
 DC Watch overview
 Yahoo Discussion Group

Neighborhood associations
Organizations established in 1910
Citizens
Organizations based in Washington, D.C.